Middle Mongol or Middle Mongolian was a Mongolic koiné language spoken in the Mongol Empire. Originating from Genghis Khan's home region of Northeastern Mongolia, it diversified into several Mongolic languages after the collapse of the empire. In comparison to Modern Mongolian, it is known to have had no long vowels, different vowel harmony and verbal systems and a slightly different case system.

Definition and historical predecessors
Middle Mongol is close to Proto-Mongolic, the ancestor language of the modern Mongolic languages, which would to set at the time when Genghis Khan united a number of tribes under his command and formed the Khamag Mongol. The term "Middle Mongol" is somewhat misleading, as what would generally by language naming rules be termed "Old Mongolian" in this terminology is actually Proto-Mongolic. The existence of another ("old") Mongol clan federation in Mongolia during the 12th century is historical, but there is no language material from this period.

According to Vovin (2018), the Ruanruan language of the Rouran Khaganate was a Mongolic language and close, but not identical, to Middle Mongolian.

Juha Janhunen (2006) classified the Khitan language into the "Para-Mongolic" family, meaning it is related to the Mongolic languages as a sister group, rather than as a direct descendant of Proto-Mongolic. Alexander Vovin has also identified several possible loanwords from Koreanic languages into Khitan. He also identified the extinct Tuyuhun language as another Para-Mongolic language.

Corpus

The temporal delimitation of Middle Mongol causes some problems as shown in definitions ranging from the 13th until the early 15th or until the late 16th century. This discrepancy is mainly due to the fact that there are very few documents written in Mongolian language to be found between the early 15th and late 16th century. It is not clear whether these two delimitations constitute conscious decisions about the classification of e.g. a small text from 1453 with less than 120 words or whether the vaster definition is just intended to fill up the time gap for which little proper evidence is available.

Middle Mongol survived in a number of scripts, namely notably ʼPhags-pa (decrees during the Yuan dynasty), Arabic (dictionaries), Chinese, Mongolian script and a few western scripts. It is a sports report written in Mongolian writing that was already fairly conventionalized then and most often dated at the verge of 1224 and 1225. However, Igor de Rachewiltz argues that it is unlikely that the stele was erected at the place where it was found in the year of the event it describes, suggesting that it is more likely to have been erected about a quarter of a century later, when Yisüngge had gained more substantial political power. If so, the earliest surviving Mongolian monument would be an edict of Töregene Khatun of 1240 and the oldest surviving text arguably The Secret History of the Mongols, a document that must originally have been written in Mongolian script in 1252, but which only survives in an edited version as a textbook for learning Mongolian from the Ming dynasty, thus reflecting the pronunciation of Middle Mongol from the second half of the 14th century.

The term "Middle Mongol" is problematic insofar as there is no body of texts that is commonly called "Old Mongol". While a revision of this terminology for the early period of Mongolian has been attempted, the lack of a thorough and linguistically-based periodization of Mongolian up to now has constituted a problem for any such attempts. The related term "Preclassical Mongolian" is applied to Middle Mongol documents in Mongolian script, since these show some distinct linguistic peculiarities.

Phonology

Middle Mongol had the consonant phonemes  and the vowel phonemes .

There appears to have been a positionally determined allophonic variation [k]~[q], [g]~[ɢ], with the postvelar allophones occurring in back-vowel contexts. Both have been claimed to occur before /i/ (depending on its origin from Proto-Mongolic */i/ or */ɯ/), which would make them phonemic.

In transliteration, /ø/ and /y/ are commonly indicated as <ö> and <ü>, respectively; /t͡ʃ/, /d͡ʒ/ and /ʃ/ are written <c> (or <č>), <j> and <sh> (or <š>); /j/ is denoted by <y>; /ŋ/ is spelt <ng>; and /ɢ/ may be expressed by <gh> (or <γ>).

Morphophonology

The vowels participate in front-back vowel harmony, where /a/, /o/ and /u/ alternate with /e/, /ø/ and /y/; in the rest of this article, morphemes are represented only by their back-vocalic allomorph. The vowel /i/ is neutral with respect to vowel harmony. Certain stems end in an 'unstable /n/' (here marked n), which is obligatorily or optionally dropped in front of various suffixes. The consonants /g/ and /k/ are elided in front of vowel-initial suffixes.

Grammar

Middle Mongol is an agglutinating language that makes nearly exclusive use of suffixes. The word order is subject–object–predicate if the subject is a noun and also object–predicate–subject if it is a pronoun. Middle Mongol rather freely allows for predicate–object, which is due to language contact. There are nine cases, the nominative being unmarked. The verbal suffixes can be divided into finite suffixes, participles and converbal suffixes. Some of the finite suffixes inflect for subject number and sex. Adjectives precede their modificatum and agree with it in number. The pronouns have a clusivity distinction.

Nominal morphology

Number 
The plural suffixes are distributed as follows:

Case endings and the reflexive suffix 
The case endings have different allomorphs depending on whether the stem ends in a vowel, the consonant /n/ or another consonant. There is also some chronological variation between earlier and later texts, as marked with the sign > in the table.

The dative-locative may denote not only an indirect object, but also local and temporal expressions, both static and dynamic. The accusative ending may be replaced by the unmarked nominative, especially if the noun is not definite and specific; in such cases, stems ending in unstable /n/ lose it. The comitative may also be used as an instrumental.

A reflexive possessive suffix (meaning 'his own', 'my own' and so on) can be placed after a noun declined for any case. Its shape varies depending on phonological factors and the genitive ending of vowel stems is also changed in front of it:

Pronouns 
The personal pronouns exhibit an inclusive-exclusive distinction. They mostly take the same case suffixes as the nouns, but display some suppletion and stem allomorphy, as summarised below:

Other pronouns and related forms are:

Indefinite pronouns are formed by combining the interrogatives and the particle -ba(r).

Verbal morphology

Finite indicative verb forms 
The finite indicative verbal suffixes express different shades of temporal, aspectual and modal meaning, and the ones with a past meaning also agree with the subject in semantic/biological gender. There are two present and two past forms, with a modal distinction between a marked and unmarked form within each pair, and a pluperfect. The usual suffixes are displayed in the table below. As above, more innovative variants are introduced with the sign >.

In addition, a durative suffix -nam is attested only in late Arabic sources (originally the converbal suffix -n, on which see below, combined with the copula a- in the narrative form). There are also some attestations of the finite use of a form in -d with plural subjects, whose singular may have been, again, a form in -n.

Deontic forms 
There are a number of forms expressing wishes and commands, as shown in the following table.

A polite request can also be expressed by a future passive participle form -qda-qu (see below).

Participles 
There are a number of participles. They may be used attributively or as standalone heads of nominal phrases, and several may also be combined with a copula to form complex verbal forms, or simply be used predicatively without a copula. They are listed in the following table.

Converbs 
Converbs are used as modifiers of the finite verb and their subject is normally the same as that of the finite verb. The following types occur:

Voice 
The voice morphology can be viewed as part of word formation. The following suffixes may be mentioned:

Middle Mongol exhibits a passive construction that is peculiar to it and maybe Buryat as well, but is not present in the other dialects or in the other Mongolic languages. While it might also have fulfilled the function to foreground the patient, it usually seems to mark actions which either affect the subject directly or indirectly affect it in a harmful way.

In §131, Belgütei is negatively affected by an unknown actor. In §112, the addressee is the passive subject. While it is possible for the speech content to be passive subject, it is far less frequent. In §178, the referent of the subject is directly affected, but syntactically, the affected noun phrase is marked with the reflexive-possessive suffix (that on its own can resemble the accusative case in other contexts). In §163, it is not the referent of the subject noun phrase, but people related to it that are directly affected to the distress of the subject.

The agent may be marked by the dative (-a and -da, but in contrast to Classical Mongolian never -dur) or the nominative:

In both of these examples, the verb stems to which the passive subject is suffixed are intransitive. Passive suffixes get suffixed to phrases, not verbal stems, e.g.:

In modern Mongolian, neither the passivization of ir- nor the suffixing of passive suffixes to phrases are possible, so the modern translation of §200 runs:

Next to the passive, there is also a causative that is, however, less notable. Subjects of intransitive verbs of clauses that are causativized get accusative marking (as in §79), while former subjects of transitive verbs get marked with dative or instrumental case (as in §188 and §31). In contrast to the passive suffix, the causative suffix doesn't attach to a phrase, but to single verbs (as long as they denote different actions):

Next to these morphemes, Middle Mongol also had suffixes to express reciprocal and cooperative meaning, namely -ldu- ~ -lda- and -lča-. On the other hand, while the plurative/distributive -čaγa- is common to modern Mongolic languages, it is not attested in Middle Mongol.

Particles 
There are a number of enclitic particles: 

There are three preposed negative particles used with verb forms:

Identity with nominal parts of speech is negated by means of the word busu (busi), pl. busud, 'other', thus literally 'X is other than Y'.

Syntax 
The usual word order is SOV, but there are deviations. A pronoun of the 1st or 2nd person may be placed as an enclitic after the verb rather than before it. In noun phrases, too, modifiers are normally placed in front of heads (i.e. adjectives and possessors precede nouns), but possessive pronouns (minu 'my' etc.) are often placed as enclitics after the head instead. Number agreement between attributes and the nouns they modify is observed optionally. There is also gender agreement (for the suffix -tu and some verbal forms), but no case agreement; instead, only the head receives the case marker. There are no conjunctions. Long sequences of converbs preceding the finite verb are common.

Word formation 
Some of the common suffixes are the following:

On the formation of verbs from other verbs, see the Voice section above.

Numerals 
The numeral system is decimal. Almost all numerals end in -n, although some are also attested without the final -n. The decimals from 20 to 50 end in -in, while those from 60 to 90 end in -an (as do many of the units); the decimals, apart from 'ten', share the same historical root with the corresponding units, but the exact derivational relation is not regular and transparent. The most common and archaic forms are as follows:

There are also simple numerals for one hundred (ja'un), one thousand (minqan/mingan) and ten thousand (tümen). 

Both teens and sums of other tens and a unit are formed by juxtaposing the ten and the unit, e.g. 15 harban tabun, lit. 'ten five'; 26 qorin jirqo'an, lit. 'twenty six'. Multiples of hundred, thousand and ten thousand are also expressed by juxtaposition, e.g. 500 tabun ja'un, lit. 'five hundred'; in these cases, the second component may also optionally stand in the plural, e.g. 500 tabun ja'ut.

Ordinal numerals are formed by the suffix -Du'ar > -Da'ar, but the shape of the stem often deviates from that of the cardinal, as seen in the table below, and there are suppletive forms for 'first' and 'second', although the less common regular ones are attested in composite numerals. The suffix -tu/-ta and the Turkic loan -cin are attested with the same function.

There are also suffixes for collectives (-'ula, 'X number together'), distributives ('-aD 'X number each'), and multiplicatives '-ta 'X times'.

Sample text 
The following is an excerpt from the Secret History of the Mongols, §§ 4-6.

See also 
Praise of Mahakala
Inscription of Hüis Tolgoi

Notes

References 
 Atwood, Christopher (2007): The date of the "Secret history of the Mongols" reconsidered. Journal of Song-Yuan Studies 37: 1–48.
 Bira, Š. et al. (2004): Mongolyn nuuc tovčoo. Ulaanbaatar: Bolor sudar.
 Cleaves, Francis Woodman (1950): The Sino-Mongolian edict of 1453. Harvard Journal of Asiatic Studies Vol. 13, No. 3/4: 431–454.
 Cleaves, Francis Woodman (1982): The Secret history of the Mongols. Cambridge: Harvard University Press.
 de Rachewiltz, Igor (1976): Some Remarks on the Stele of Yisüngge. In: Walter Heissig et al.: Tractata Altaica – Denis Sinor, sexagenario optime de rebus altaicis merito dedicata. Wiesbaden: Harrassowitz: 487–508.
 de Rachewiltz, Igor (1999): Some reflections on so-called Written Mongolian. In: Helmut Eimer, Michael Hahn, Maria Schetelich and Peter Wyzlic (eds.): Studia Tibetica et Mongolica – Festschrift Manfred Taube. Swisttal-Odendorf: Indica et Tibetica: 235–246.
 de Rachewiltz, Igor (2004): The Secret history of the Mongols. Brill: Leiden.
 Γarudi (2002): Dumdadu üy-e-yin mongγul kelen-ü bütüče-yin kelberi-yin sudulul. Kökeqota: Öbür mongγul-un arad-un keblel-ün qoriy-a.
 Janhunen, Juha (ed.) (2003): The Mongolic languages. London: Routledge.
 Janhunen, Juha (2003a): Proto-Mongolic. In: Janhunen 2003: 1–29.
 Janhunen, Juha (2003b): Para-Mongolic. In: Janhunen 2003: 391–402.
 Ōsaki, Noriko (2006): “Genchō hishi” no gengo ni mirareru judōbun. In: Arakawa Shintarō et al. (ed.): Shōgaito Masahiro sensei tainin kinen ronshū – Yūrajia shogengo no kenkyū. Tōkyō: Yūrajia gengo no kenkyū kankōkai: 175–253.
 Poppe, Nicholas (1955): Introduction to Mongolian comparative studies. Helsinki: Finno-Ugrian society.
 Poppe, Nicholas (1964 [1954]): Grammar of Written Mongolian. Wiesbaden: Harrassowitz.
 Poppe, Nicholas (1965): The passive constructions in the language of the Secret history. Ural-Altaische Jahrbücher 36: 365–377.
 Rybatzki, Volker (2003): Middle Mongol. In: Janhunen 2003: 47–82.
 Svantesson, Jan-Olof, Anna Tsendina, Anastasia Karlsson, Vivan Franzén (2005): The Phonology of Mongolian. New York: Oxford University Press.

External links
 Monumenta Altaica grammars, texts, dictionaries and bibliographies of Mongolian and other Altaic languages
 Lingua Mongolia information on Classical Mongolian, including an online dictionary
Éva Csáki (2006) "Middle Mongolian Loan Words in Volga Kipchak Languages"

Mongolic languages
Extinct languages of Asia